To Be Loved (French: Pour être aimé) is a 1933 French comedy film directed by Jacques Tourneur and starring Pierre Richard-Willm, Suzy Vernon and Colette Darfeuil.

The film's sets were designed by the art director Pierre Schild.

Synopsis
In order to be loved for himself rather than his money, a young millionaire gets a job working as a barman.

Cast
 Pierre Richard-Willm as Gérard d'Ormoise
 Suzy Vernon as Edith
 Marguerite Moreno as Marie-Josèphe des Espinettes
 Colette Darfeuil as Maud
 Paulette Dubost as Maryse
 Fred Pasquali as Emilien
 Jean Hubert as Victor
 Marthe Sarbel as Mme. Costebrave
 William Aguet as Anthénor de la Chaulme-Percée
 Heritza as Chanteuse
 Pierre Juvenet as Costebrave
Georges Tréville as Weston

References

Bibliography 
Parish, James Robert & Pitts, Michael R. Film directors: a guide to their American films. Scarecrow Press, 1974.

External links 
 

1933 films
French comedy films
French black-and-white films
1933 comedy films
1930s French-language films
Films directed by Jacques Tourneur
Pathé films
1930s French films